Moussa Doumbia (born 4 April 1989) is a Burkinabé professional footballer who plays as a defender for French fourth-tier club Sablé. He previously played for Le Mans and in Ligue 2 for FC Istres. He has been capped for the Burkina Faso national team.

Club career
Doumbia moved to FC Istres in 2009 and played for Istres B in 2009–10, but failed to progress to the club's first team until the next season. He made three league appearances for Istres in the 2010–11 season, featuring against FC Metz, Stade Lavallois and AC Ajaccio. Istres lost two and drew one of these games. Doumbia also made one appearance in the 2010–11 Coupe de France for Istres, scoring in his side's 3–2 loss to Nimes Olympique in the eighth round of the competition. He moved back to Istres' "B" team for the 2011–12 season. He later scored on his first season appearance for the B team.

Doumbia signed for Le Mans in 2012 and remained with the club for six seasons before moving on to National 2 club Granville in 2018.

International career
Doumbia made his debut for the Burkina Faso national team on 29 August 2011 in a 3–0 friendly defeat to South Africa.

Notes

References

1989 births
Living people
People from Bingerville
Citizens of Burkina Faso through descent
Burkinabé footballers
Burkina Faso international footballers
Ivorian footballers
Ivorian people of Burkinabé descent
Sportspeople of Burkinabé descent
Association football defenders
FC Istres players
Le Mans FC players
US Granville players
Ligue 2 players
Burkinabé expatriate footballers
Burkinabé expatriate sportspeople in France
Ivorian expatriate footballers
Ivorian expatriate sportspeople in France
21st-century Burkinabé people